Kate Serjeantson (died 1918) was a Welsh stage actress of the early 20th century who performed in various productions, such as The Case of Lady Camber (1917) and Rambler Rose (1917). In films she was sometimes credited as Kate Sergeantson.

Partial filmography
 Who's Who in Society (1915)
 Passers By (1916)
 Outcast (1917)
 The Beautiful Adventure (1917)

References

External links

1918 deaths
Welsh film actresses
Welsh silent film actresses
Date of birth missing
Place of birth missing
Date of death missing
Place of death missing